Qari'at al-Finjan ("The Fortune Teller") is a poem written by Nizar Qabbani and performed by Abdel Halim Hafez. He sang it for the first time in April 1976. The song is considered to be one of the classic Arabic songs, and one of the most notable Abdel Halim songs. The song was composed by Mohamed El Muji. In fact, Qari'at al-Finjan was the last recording by Abdel Halim. It was recorded a year before his death and he recorded it while he was in severe pain due to liver failure.

The subject is a fortune-teller (practising tasseography, by interpreting coffee grounds) who predicts an unhappy love.

Omar Offendum converted the poem into a rap tune called "Finjan", and he mixed the original Arabic text with its translation. Also, in 2021, a series was produced under the name of the poem "Qariat El Fingan".

References

External links 
 Full song on YouTube.
 Qariat El Fingan English translation.

Arabic poetry
Love in Arabic literature
20th-century works
20th-century poems